Millie Perkins (born May 12, 1938) is an American former film and television actress known for her debut film role as Anne Frank in The Diary of Anne Frank (1959), and for her supporting actress roles in two 1966 Westerns, The Shooting and Ride in the Whirlwind, both directed by Monte Hellman.

Early life and career
Born on May 12, 1938, in Passaic, New Jersey, Perkins grew up in Fair Lawn and attended Fair Lawn High School. Her father was a merchant marine captain of Hungarian and Mongolian descent. Perkins was working as a receptionist at a New York City advertising agency when she caught the eye of a visiting photographer with a resultant career as a model; by 1958, Perkins was an international cover girl.

Soon thereafter, Perkins was vigorously pursued, and then selected, to portray Dutch Jewish diarist and Holocaust victim Anne Frank in the 1959 film adaptation of The Diary of Anne Frank. Perkins had never studied nor sought to be an actress, but director George Stevens saw her photo and tried to convince her to read for the part. Finally, she flew to Hollywood for a screen test, and with much fanfare, landed the role. Perkins received almost universally excellent reviews for her portrayal of Frank, although the film was less of a box-office success than expected.

After her work with George Stevens, Perkins was placed under contract to 20th Century Fox. She was one of the promising young stars of Hollywood, but the studio contract system, which was coming to an end, was a poor fit for Perkins, who had come of age with the Beat Generation in 1950s New York City. George Stevens would later state: "Millie did not fit in. She was 10 years too early." Suspended for refusing the lead in the 1960 film Tess of the Storm Country – Perkins saw the film as a B-picture and a step back career-wise – Perkins was cast by 20th Century Fox in the 1961 film Wild in the Country, playing the supporting role of the girlfriend to star Elvis Presley – she would later play Gladys Presley in the 1990 miniseries Elvis; the studio then dropped Perkins. Joshua Logan personally selected Perkins for the female lead in the 1964 film Ensign Pulver, but the film was a failure; Perkins would not appear in another mainstream film release for almost 20 years. She played the female lead in both of Jack Nicholson's inaugural productions The Shooting and Ride in the Whirlwind – shot side by side in 1965 – and in 1968 co-starred in Wild in the Streets which was written by her then-husband Robert Thom.

Later career
In 1976, Perkins moved to Jacksonville, Oregon, with her two daughters by Robert Thom, Lillie and Hedy; in 1977, People magazine reported that Perkins "conducts a drama-therapy workshop every Tuesday night in her living room and often speaks to high-school drama groups in the area." In 1982, it was reported that Perkins was teaching drama at Southern Oregon University.

In 1983, Perkins returned to feature films to play Jon Voight's ex-wife in Table for Five. She then played "mother roles" for the next 20 years; including Sean Penn's mother in the fact-based film At Close Range, the mother of Charlie Sheen's character in the 1987 movie Wall Street, the bereft Jewish mother in the 1996 film The Chamber, and Andy García's mother in the 2005 film The Lost City.

Television work
In 1961, Perkins made her television debut as a guest star on Wagon Train. As with her film work, her television appearances were sporadic until the 1980s, from when she had appeared on a variety of television shows, including seven episodes of Knots Landing (over the period 1983–1990) and fourteen episodes of Any Day Now (1998–2002).  She portrayed character Glenda Vandervere in Murder, She Wrote (season two, episode 12: "Murder by Appointment Only") (01/05/1986). Perkins retired from acting after a 2006 six-episode arc on the television soap opera The Young and the Restless. Recent to her retirement, she was honored in the 2004 action-adventure video game Grand Theft Auto: San Andreas, in which one of the storyline girlfriends to protagonist Carl "CJ" Johnson, voiced by Orfeh, was named after her.

Marriages
On April 15, 1960, she married actor Dean Stockwell. They divorced on July 30, 1962. She later married writer and director Robert Thom, who wrote the script for the popular 1968 movie Wild in the Streets, in which she appeared. They had two children: Lillie Thom (b. 1966) and Hedy Thom (b. 1969). Perkins and Thom had been separated for some time when Thom died in 1979.

Filmography

Films

The Diary of Anne Frank (1959) - Anne Frank
Wild in the Country (1961) - Betty Lee Parsons
Dulcinea (1962) - Aldonza / Dulcinea del Toboso
Ensign Pulver (1964) - Scotty
The Shooting (1966) - Woman
Ride in the Whirlwind (1966) - Abigail
Wild in the Streets (1968) - Mary Fergus
Cockfighter (1974) - Frances Mansfield
Lady Cocoa (1975) - Marie
Alias Big Cherry (1975)
The Witch Who Came from the Sea (1976) - Molly
A Gun in the House (1981, TV movie) - Lena Webber
MacBeth (1981, video) - Lady Macduff
The Trouble with Grandpa (1981, TV short)
Love in the Present Tense (1982, TV movie)
Table for Five (1983) - Kathleen
The Haunting Passions (1983, TV movie)
License to Kill (1984, TV movie) - Mary Fiske
Anatomy of an Illness (1984, TV movie) - Ellen Cousins
Shattered Vows (1984, TV movie) - Mrs. Gilligan
The Other Lover (1985, TV movie) - Kate
At Close Range (1986) - Julie
Jake Speed (1986) - Mrs. Winston
Penalty Phase (1986, TV movie) - Nancy Faulkner
Slam Dance (1987) - Bobby Nye
Strange Voices (1987, TV movie) - Helen
Wall Street (1987) - Mrs. Fox
Broken Angel (1988, TV movie) - Penny Bartman
Two Moon Junction (1988) - Mrs. Delongpre
Call Me Anna (1990, TV movie) - Frances Duke
The Pistol: The Birth of a Legend (1991) - Helen Maravich
Necronomicon (1993) - Lena (part 2)
Murder of Innocence (1993, TV movie) - Edna Webber
Midnight Run for Your Life (1994, TV movie) - Aunt Mimi
Bodily Harm (1995) - Dr. Spencer
Harvest of Fire (1996, TV movie) - Ruth
The Chamber (1996) - Ruth Kramer
The Summer of Ben Tyler (1996, TV movie) - Doris
A Woman's a Helluva Thing (2001, TV movie) - Annie
The Lost City (2005) - Doña Cecilia Fellove
Yesterday's Dream (2005) - Mrs. Hollister
Though None Go with Me (2006, TV movie) - Frances Childs

Television
This, unlike the complete film listing above, includes only series in which Perkins had a recurring role.

Knots Landing (1983-84; 1990) - Jane Sumner
A.D. (1985, TV miniseries) - Mary
Elvis (1990, TV miniseries) - Gladys Presley
Any Day Now (1998-2002) - Irene O'Brien Otis
The Young and the Restless (2006) - Rebecca Kaplan

References

External links

 

1938 births
American film actresses
American people of Hungarian descent
American people of Mongolian descent
American television actresses
Living people
Fair Lawn High School alumni
People from Fair Lawn, New Jersey
People from Passaic, New Jersey
American female models
20th Century Studios contract players